Liu Chen may refer to:

Liu Chen (Shu Han) (died 263), Chinese prince of Shu Han
Liu Chen (physicist) (born 1946), American physicist
Liu Chen (magician) (born 1976), Taiwanese magician
Serena Liu (1975–2020), or Liu Chen, Taiwanese dancer

See also
Liu Zhen (disambiguation)